Tomás Casillas, O.P. (died 1567) was a Roman Catholic prelate who served as Bishop of Chiapas (1552–1567).

Biography
Tomás Casillas was born in León, Spain and ordained a priest in the Order of Friars Preachers.
On 19 Jan 1551, he was appointed during the papacy of Pope Julius III as Bishop of Chiapas.
In 1552, he was consecrated bishop by Francisco Marroquín Hurtado, Bishop of Santiago de Guatemala 
He served as Bishop of Chiapas until his death on 29 Oct 1567.

References

External links and additional sources
 (for Chronology of Bishops) 
 (for Chronology of Bishops)  

16th-century Roman Catholic bishops in Mexico
Bishops appointed by Pope Julius III
1567 deaths
Dominican bishops
People from León, Spain